The 2018 Asian Road Cycling Championships were held in Naypyidaw, Myanmar from 8 February to 12 February 2018.

Medal summary

Men

Women

Medal table

References

External links
Results 
Road Results book

Asian Cycling Championships
Asia
Cycling Championships
Asian Cycling Championships
International sports competitions hosted by Myanmar
February 2018 sports events in Asia